Kawe may refer to:

 Kawe (Tanzanian ward), an administrative unit in Tanzania
 Kawe Island, in the Raja Ampat Archipelago in Indonesia
 Kawe language, the Austronesian language spoken there